Fayal Sport Club is a Portuguese sports club from Horta, Azores.

The men's football team plays in the district league. The team enjoyed spells in the Terceira Divisão in 1997–98, 1999–2000, 2001–02, 2006 to 2008 and 2011–12. The team also contested the Taça de Portugal during these years.

References

Football clubs in Portugal
Association football clubs established in 1909
1909 establishments in Portugal
Football clubs in the Azores